Briseida Torres Reyes is a Puerto Rican lawyer and government official serving as the Secretary of Labor and Human Resources of Puerto Rico. She was previously a judicial official of associate justice Luis Estrella Martínez.

Education 
Briseida Torres Reyes completed a Bachelor of Business Administration at the University of Puerto Rico, Río Piedras Campus. She completed a J.D. at the University of Puerto Rico School of Law.

Career 
Torres Reyes was an associate lawyer in a labor division at the law firm, O'Neill & Borges. She was a judicial official of the associate justice, Luis Estrella Martínez.

On May 20, 2019, Torres Reyes was appointed Secretary of Labor and Human Resources of Puerto Rico by Governor Ricardo Rosselló, succeeding incumbent secretary, Carlos Saavedra Gutiérrez.

On June 9, 2020, she announced her resignation as Secretary of Labor and Human Resources effective on June 15, 2020. She was succeeded by Carlos Rivera Santiago.

References 

Living people
Year of birth missing (living people)
Secretaries of Labor and Human Resources of Puerto Rico
Puerto Rican women lawyers
21st-century Puerto Rican lawyers
Women government officials
University of Puerto Rico, Río Piedras Campus alumni
21st-century American women lawyers
21st-century American lawyers